Warradarge Wind Farm is under construction  northeast of Warradarge, and   southeast of Eneabba in the Mid West region of Western Australia. The first of its planned 51 turbines was completed on 21 January 2020.

It is owned by Bright Energy Investments, a joint venture between the Dutch fund manager DIF Capital Partners (40.05%), Australian industry superannuation fund Cbus (40.05%), and the Western Australian government's electricity generator and retailer Synergy (19.9%). The construction and maintenance contracts are with Danish company Vestas.

Originally proposed in 2012 for up to 100 turbines generating 250 MW of electricity, when completed the wind farm will generate up to 180 MW from 51 turbines for the South West Interconnected System, the electricity grid in southern Western Australia. 

The wind turbines are manufactured by Vestas with 66 metre blades and a tip height of 152 metres above the ground. Western Power will construct a new  transmission line from the wind farm to the existing 330 kV transmission network.

Operations 
AEMO records begin in August 2020 for the wind farm. The generation table uses AEMO Facility SCADA to obtain generation values for each month.  Warradarge's code is WARRADARGE_WF1. A SUMIF operation is used on the data published by AEMO to get the total (shown in the table below). Note that each month's values start 8 hours into the respective month and extend 8 hours into the next month, in line with the trading day defined in the Wholesale Energy Market Rules.=SUMIF(E2:E Last Row,"*WARRADARGE_WF1*",F2:F Last Row)

Note: Asterisk indicates power output was limited during the month.

References

Wind farms in Western Australia
Mid West (Western Australia)